De Nolet (also known as Noletmolen) is a wind turbine in Schiedam, The Netherlands which is disguised as a traditional Schiedam windmill. De Nolet has a tower height of 43 metres and a gross height of 55 metres including its rotor tips. The turbine's rated capacity is 150 kW.

It is 9 metres higher than De Noord which is the tallest windmill in the world.

De Nolet was built in 2005 by the Nolet Distillery to power their brewing factory which produces the Ketel One vodkas and gins.

See also 
 List of windmills in Schiedam
 Fuhrländer Wind Turbine Laasow, tallest wind turbine in the world

References

External links 

 Nolet Distillery official site

Tower mills in the Netherlands
Windmills in South Holland
Buildings and structures in Schiedam